Mollalu (also Romanized as Mollālū; also known as Mollā ‘Alī) is a village in Abish Ahmad Rural District, Abish Ahmad District, Kaleybar County, East Azerbaijan Province, Iran. At the 2006 census, its population was 135, in 29 families.

References 

Populated places in Kaleybar County